The Anglo-Saxon Chronicle records a battle fought in the year 715 at Woden's Burg, the neolithic long barrow now known as Adam's Grave, near Marlborough, Wiltshire. The entry states: "Her Ine 7 Ceolred fuhton æt Woddes beorge." (There Ine and Ceolred fought at Woden's hill.)

Ine was king of Anglo-Saxon Wessex and Ceolred was king of Anglo-Saxon Mercia. The identity of the opposing force is not recorded.

The Anglo-Saxon Chronicle also records an earlier battle on the same site. The area was of strategic importance since it lay near the intersection of the ancient Ridgeway with Wansdyke.

References

External links
 

710s conflicts
Battles involving Wessex
Battles involving the Britons
Military history of Wiltshire
715
8th century in England